Faraib is a 1983 Indian Hindi-language feature film directed by Rajat Rakshit, starring Mithun Chakraborty, Ranjeeta in lead roles.

Cast
Mithun Chakraborty as Vikas "Vicky"
Ranjeeta as Meena
Shreeram Lagoo as Bansi
Nazir Hussain as Mr. Khanna
Mukri as College Principal
Jagdeep as Raghunath
Mohan Choti as Balmukund 
Mehmood Junior as Prabhudas

Soundtrack

References

External links
 
http://ibosnetwork.com/asp/filmbodetails.asp?id=Faraib

1983 films
1980s Hindi-language films
Indian drama films
1983 drama films
Hindi-language drama films